Mehdi Kouchakzadeh is an Iranian Hydraulic engineer, academic and principlist politician, who was member of Islamic Consultative Assembly from 2004 until 2016.

Parliamentary career

Controversy 
In an 8th parliament session speech, Ali Motahari claimed that he has Russian roots and his former surname was "Küçükov". Koochakzadeh then threw the microphone at Motahari, who reacted by saying, "Shut Up And Sit Down, Moron!"

He engaged in a yelling match with Javad Zarif in a June 2015 session, calling him a "traitor". The scene was recorded by cellphone cameras and went viral on social media.

In an August 2014 interview, he said that the majority of Iranian journalists "write lies in return for money." In 2013, Koochakzadeh called Iranian photographers "pornographers" for taking pictures of parliament members while they were napping during sessions.

Commenting on Marietje Schaake's 2015 visit to Iran, he referred to Schaake as "uncultured" and said her outfit "appropriate for a party and dancing."

Electoral history

References

External links 

Living people
1967 births
Members of the 7th Islamic Consultative Assembly
Members of the 9th Islamic Consultative Assembly
Members of the 8th Islamic Consultative Assembly
Coalition of the Pleasant Scent of Servitude politicians
Front of Islamic Revolution Stability politicians
Alliance of Builders of Islamic Iran politicians
Society of Devotees of the Islamic Revolution politicians
Iranian civil engineers
Tarbiat Modares University alumni
University of Tehran alumni
Academic staff of Tarbiat Modares University
Jihad of Construction personnel of the Iran–Iraq War
Islamic Revolutionary Guard Corps personnel of the Iran–Iraq War